The 2007 Manitoba general election was held on May 22, 2007 to elect Members of the Legislative Assembly of the Province of Manitoba, Canada. It was won by the New Democratic Party, which won 36 seats out of 57.  The Progressive Conservative Party finished second with nineteen seats.  The Liberal Party won two seats. As a result, Premier of Manitoba Gary Doer received a mandate to form a third consecutive majority government, becoming the first Premier of Manitoba to achieve this since Duff Roblin in 1966.

The election resulted in very few changes from the party standings at the dissolution of the previous legislature. One New Democrat incumbent was defeated by a Progressive Conservative challenger, and one Progressive Conservative incumbent was defeated by a New Democrat. The PCs picked up one seat that was previously held by an independent, and the NDP picked up one seat that was vacant at dissolution. The other 53 seats in the legislature were all retained by their incumbent parties. The popular vote was also very similar, with the New Democrats dropping 1.47% and the Progressive Conservatives gaining 1.70% overall.

Results

|- bgcolor=CCCCCC
!rowspan="2" colspan="2" align=left|Party
!rowspan="2" align=left|Party leader
!rowspan="2"|Candidates
!colspan="4" align=center|Seats
!colspan="3" align=center|Popular vote
|- bgcolor=CCCCCC
|align="center"|2003
|align="center"|Dissol.
|align="center"|2007
|align="center"|+/—
|align="center"|#
|align="center"|%
|align="center"|Change

|align=left|New Democratic
|align=left|Gary Doer
|align="right"|57
|align="right"|35
|align="right"|35
|align="right"|36
|align="right"|+1
|align="right"|200,834
|align="right"|48.00%
|align="right"|–1.47%

|align=left|Progressive Conservative
|align=left|Hugh McFadyen
|align="right"|56
|align="right"|20
|align="right"|18
|align="right"|19
|align="right"|–1
|align="right"|158,511
|align="right"|37.89%
|align="right"|+1.70%

|align=left|Liberal
|align=left|Jon Gerrard
|align="right"|57
|align="right"|2
|align="right"|2
|align="right"|2
|align="right"|0
|align="right"|51,857
|align="right"|12.39%
|align="right"|–0.80%

|align=left|Andrew Basham
|align="right"|15
|align="right"|0
|align="right"|0
|align="right"|0
|align="right"|—
|align="right"|5,586
|align="right"|1.34%
|align="right"|+0.38%

|align=left|Darrell Rankin
|align="right"|6
|align="right"|0
|align="right"|0
|align="right"|0
|align="right"|—
|align="right"|367
|align="right"|0.09%
|align="right"|+0.01%

|colspan=2 align=left|Independents and no affiliation
|align="right"|5
|align="right"|0
|align="right"|1
|align="right"|0
|align="right"|—
|align="right"|1,235
|align="right"|0.30%
|align="right"|+0.26%

|align=left colspan="4"|Vacant
|align="right"|1
|align="center" colspan="5"| 
|-
|align=left colspan="3"|Total
| align="right"|196
| align="right"|57
| align="right"|57
| align="right"|57
| align="right"|—
| align="right"|420,540
| align="right"|56.75%
| align="right"| 
|-
|align=left colspan="8"|Registered Voters
|align="right"|740,991
|align="center" colspan="5"| 
|}

Results by region

Results by place

Candidates by riding

Northern Manitoba/Parkland

|-
|bgcolor=whitesmoke|Dauphin-Roblin
||
|Stan Struthers 4,214 (53.50%)
|
|Lloyd McKinney 3,257 (41.35%)
|
|Yarko Petryshyn 385 (4.89%)
|
|
|
|
||
|Stan Struthers
|-
|bgcolor=whitesmoke|Flin Flon
||
|Gerard Jennissen 2,255 (76.73%)
|
|
|
|Gary Zamzow  651 (22.08%)
|
|
|
|
||
|Gerrard Jennissen
|-
|bgcolor=whitesmoke|Rupertsland
||
|Eric Robinson 2,092 (58.21%)
|
|David Harper 1,285 (35.75%)
|
|Earl Fontaine 202 (5.62%)
|
|
|
|
||
|Eric Robinson
|-
|bgcolor=whitesmoke|Swan River
||
|Rosann Wowchuk 4,522 (58.18%)
|
|Maxine Plesiuk 2,915 (37.51%)
|
|Niomi Spence-Pranteau 306 (3.93%)
|
|
|
|
||
|Rosann Wowchuk
|-
|bgcolor=whitesmoke|The Pas
||
|Oscar Lathlin  3,262 (68.30%)
|
|George Muswaggon  1,016 (21.27%)
|
|James Houston  459 (9.61%)
|
|
|
|
||
|Oscar Lathlin
|-
|bgcolor=whitesmoke|Thompson
||
|Steve Ashton 3,036 (73.44%)
|
|Cory Phillips 416 (10.06%)
|
|Kenny Braun 651 (15.89%)
|
|
|
|
||
|Steve Ashton
|-
|bgcolor=whitesmoke| Totals 
|
|NDP19,381 (62.67%)
|
|PC8,889 (28.74%)
|
|Liberal2,654 (8.58%)
|
|
|
|
|
|
|}

Westman

|-
|bgcolor=whitesmoke|Arthur-Virden
|
|Bob Senff 2,141 (30.81%)
||
|Larry Maguire 4,451 (64.05%)
|
|Fred Curry 357 (5.14%)
|
|
|
|
||
|Larry Maguire
|-
|bgcolor=whitesmoke|Brandon East
||
|Drew Caldwell3,760 (53.95%)
|
|Mike Waddell2,655 (38.10%)
|
|Cheryl Burke554 (7.95%)
|
|
|
|
||
|Drew Caldwell
|-
|bgcolor=whitesmoke|Brandon West
|
|Scott Smith4,674 (47.48%)
||
|Rick Borotsik4,730 (48.04%)
|
|M.J. Willard398 (4.04%)
|
|
|
|Lisa Gallagher (Communist)43 (0.44%)
||
|Scott Smith
|-
|bgcolor=whitesmoke|Minnedosa
|
|Harvey Paterson 2,769 (38.44%)
||
|Leanne Rowat 3,790 (52.62%)
|
|Christopher Baker 268 (3.72%)
|
|James Beddome 281 (3.90%)
|
|Colin Atkins (Ind) 72 (1.00%)
||
|Leanne Rowat
|-
|bgcolor=whitesmoke|Russell
|
|Teri Nicholson  2,375 (33.45%)
||
|Len Derkach  4,141 (58.32%)
|
|Clarice Wilson  564 (7.94%)
|
|
|
|
||
|Len Derkach
|-
|bgcolor=whitesmoke| Totals 
|
|NDP15,719 (41.34%)
|
|PC19,767 (51.99%)
|
|Liberal2,141 (5.60%)
|
|Green281 (0.74%)
|
|Other115 (0.30%)
|
|
|}

Central Manitoba

|-
|bgcolor=whitesmoke|Carman
|
|Sharon Sadowy  1,440 (21.71%)
||
|Blaine Pedersen  3,845 (57.96%)
|
|Don Oldcorn  1,293 (19.49%)
|
|
|
|
||
|Denis Rocan†
|-
|bgcolor=whitesmoke|Gimli
||
|Peter Bjornson 5,946 (58.43%)
|
|Chris Bourgeois 3,450 (33.90%)
|
|Lynn Greenberg 727 (7.14%)
|
|
|
|
||
|Peter Bjornson
|-
|bgcolor=whitesmoke|Interlake
||
|Tom Nevakshonoff 4,047 (59.30%)
|
|Garry Wasylowski 2,445 (35.82%)
|
|Franklin Swark 309 (4.53%)
|
|
|
|
||
|Tom Nevakshonoff
|-
|bgcolor=whitesmoke|Lakeside
|
|Mitch Obach 2,631 (33.08%)
||
|Ralph Eichler 4,448 (55.93%)
|
|Ian Band 488 (6.14%)
|
|David Michael Carey 349 (4.39%)
|
|
||
|Ralph Eichler
|-
|bgcolor=whitesmoke|Morris
|
|Kevin Stevenson  2,517 (32.31%)
||
|Mavis Taillieu  4,404 (56.53%)
|
|Michael Sherby  808 (10.37%)
|
|
|
|
||
|Mavis Taillieu
|-
|bgcolor=whitesmoke|Pembina
|
|Lisa Moore  960 (14.25%)
||
|Peter Dyck  5,192 (77.06%)
|
|Ralph Gowan  570 (8.46%)
|
|
|
|
||
|Peter Dyck
|-
|bgcolor=whitesmoke|Portage la Prairie
|
|James Kostuchuk  2,935 (42.23%)
||
|David Faurschou  3,344 (48.16%)
|
|Marvin Krawec  643 (9.25%)
|
|
|
|
||
|David Faurschou
|-
|bgcolor=whitesmoke|Selkirk
||
|Greg Dewar 4,584 (55.26%)
|
|Gordie Dehn 2,951 (35.57%)
|
|Karen Keppler 704 (8.49%)
|
|
|
|
||
|Greg Dewar
|-
|bgcolor=whitesmoke|Ste. Rose
|
|Denise Harder  2,022 (33.08%)
||
|Stu Briese  3,599 (58.89%)
|
|Janelle Mailhot  465 (7.61%)
|
|
|
|
||
|Glen Cummings†
|-
|bgcolor=whitesmoke|Turtle Mountain
|
|Faron Douglas 1,476 (22.45%)
||
|Cliff Cullen 4,318 (65.67%)
|
|Allen Hunter 739 (11.24%)
|
|
|
|
||
|Cliff Cullen
|-
|bgcolor=whitesmoke| Totals 
|
|NDP28,558 (38.64%)
|
|PC37,996 (51.40%)
|
|Liberal6,746 (9.12%)
|
|Green617 (0.83%)
|
|
|
|
|}

Eastman

|-
|bgcolor=whitesmoke|Emerson
|
|Chris Murash 1,296 (21.23%)
||
|Cliff Graydon 3,636 (59.56%)
|
|Monica Guetre 1,117 (18.30%)
|
|
|
|
||
|Jack Penner†
|-
|bgcolor=whitesmoke|Lac du Bonnet
|
|Patrick O'Connor 2,773 (33.51%)
||
|Gerald Hawranik 4,855 (58.81%)
|
|Christopher Gmiterek 607 (7.33%)
|
|
|
|
||
|Gerald Hawranik
|-
|bgcolor=whitesmoke|La Verendrye
||
|Ron Lemieux 4,018 (51.12%)
|
|Bob Stefaniuk 2,973 (37.82%)
|
|Roland Chaput 490 (6.23%)
|
|
|
|Jay Murray (Ind) 379 (4.82%)
||
|Ron Lemieux
|-
|bgcolor=whitesmoke|Springfield
|
|Ernest Muswagon 2,656 (29.91%)
||
|Ron Schuler 5,165 (58.16%)
|
|James Johnston 1,014 (11.42%)
|
|
|
|
||
|Ron Schuler
|-
|bgcolor=whitesmoke|Steinbach
|
|Rawle Squires  641 (8.66%)
||
|Kelvin Goertzen 6,143 (82.98%)
|
|John Thiessen  350 (4.74%)
|
|Janine Gibson  268 (3.62%)
|
|
||
|Kelvin Goertzen
|-
|bgcolor=whitesmoke| Totals 
|
|NDP11,384 (30.05%)
|
|PC22,272 (58.79%)
|
|Liberal3,578 (9.46%)
|
|Green268 (0.70%)
|
|Other379 (1.00%)
|
|
|}

Northwest Winnipeg

|-
|bgcolor=whitesmoke|Burrows
||
|Doug Martindale  3,790 (70.75%)
|
|Rick Negrych  1,005 (18.76%)
|
|Bernd Hohne  562 (11.09%)
|
|
|
|
||
|Doug Martindale
|-
|bgcolor=whitesmoke|Inkster
|
|Romulo Magsino  2,358 (34.13%)
|
|Roger Bennett  543 (7.89%)
||
|Kevin Lamoureux  3,962 (57.49%)
|
|
|
|
||
|Kevin Lamoureux
|-
|bgcolor=whitesmoke|Kildonan
||
|Dave Chomiak 5,012 (61.35%)
|
|Brent Olynyk 2,360 (28.89%)
|
|Wade Parke 554 (6.78%)
|
|Nathan Zahn 203 (2.49%)
|
|
||
|Dave Chomiak
|-
|bgcolor=whitesmoke|Point Douglas
||
|George Hickes  2,665 (66.36%)
|
|Alexa Rosentreter  481 (11.98%)
|
|Mary Lou Bourgeois  591 (14.72%)
|
|Kristen Andrews  213 (5.30%) 
|
|Darrell Rankin (Communist)  66 (1.64%)
||
|George Hickes
|-
|bgcolor=whitesmoke|St. Johns
||
|Gord Mackintosh 4,223 (68.59%)
|
|Tim Hooper 1,018 (16.53%)
|
|Selina Sapong-Bieber 604 (9.81%)
|
|Dawn Carey 291 (4.72%)
|
|
||
|Gord Mackintosh
|-
|bgcolor=whitesmoke|The Maples
||
|Mohinder Saran 3,617 (55.64%)
|
|Lou Fernandez 1,895 (29.15%)
|
|Pritam Brar 928 (14.27%)
|
|
|
|
||
|Cris Aglugub†
|-
|bgcolor=whitesmoke|Wellington
||
|Flor Marcelino 2,332 (53.35%)
|
|José Tomas  570 (12.97%)
|
|Rhonda Gordon Powers  718 (16.72%)
|
|
|
|Joe Chan (Ind)  501 (11.53%)  Conrad Santos (Ind)  183 (4.19%)
||
|Conrad Santos
|-
|bgcolor=whitesmoke| Totals 
|
|NDP23,997 (56.75%)
|
|PC7,872 (18.62%)
|
|Liberal7,912 (18.71%)
|
|Green707 (1.67%)
|
|Other794 (1.88%)
|
|
|}

Northeast Winnipeg

|-
|bgcolor=whitesmoke|Concordia
||
|Gary Doer 3,862 (69.05%)
|
|Ken Waddell 1,209 (21.62%)
|
|Leslie Worthington 336 (6.01%)
|
|Andrew Basham 186 (3.33%)
|
|
||
|Gary Doer
|-
|bgcolor=whitesmoke|Elmwood
||
|Jim Maloway 3,873 (61.51%)
|
|Allister Carrington 1,323 (21.01%)
|
|David Love 1,101 (17.48%)
|
|
|
|
||
|Jim Maloway
|-
|bgcolor=whitesmoke|Radisson
||
|Bidhu Jha 4,804 (56.72%)
|
|Linda West 2,988 (35.28%)
|
|Murray Cliff 677 (7.99%)
|
|
|
|
||
|Bidhu Jha
|-
|bgcolor=whitesmoke|River East
|
|Kurt Penner  4,299 (46.07%
||
|Bonnie Mitchelson  4,348 (46.63%)
|
|Margaret von Lau  635 (6.80%)
|
|
|
|
||
|Bonnie Mitchelson
|-
|bgcolor=whitesmoke|Rossmere
||
|Erna Braun  4,824 (60.38%)
|
|Cathy Cox  2,602 (32.56%)
|
|Isaiah Oyeleru  521 (6.52%)
|
|
|
|
||
|Harry Schellenberg†
|-
|bgcolor=whitesmoke|St. Boniface
||
|Greg Selinger  5,068 (66.04%)
|
|Jennifer Tarrant  999 (12.88%)
|
|Gilbert Laberge  1,044 (13.61%)
|
|Alain Landry  528 (6.88%)
|
|Thane-Dominic Carr (Communist)  44 (0.58%)
||
|Greg Selinger
|-
|bgcolor=whitesmoke|Transcona
||
|Daryl Reid 4,560 (68.74%)
|
|Bryan McLeod 1,470 (22.16%)
|
|Gerald Basarab 604 (9.10%)
|
|
|
|
||
|Daryl Reid
|-
|bgcolor=whitesmoke| Totals 
|
|NDP31,290 (60.28%)
|
|PC14,939 (28.78%)
|
|Liberal4,918 (9.48%)
|
|Green714 (1.38%)
|
|Other44 (0.08%)
|
|
|}

West Winnipeg

|-
|bgcolor=whitesmoke|Assiniboia
||
|Jim Rondeau  5,177 (62.21%)
|
|Kelly de Groot  2,686 (32.38%)
|
|Bernie Bellan  459 (5.52%)
|
|
|
|
||
|Jim Rondeau
|-
|bgcolor=whitesmoke|Charleswood
|
|Mel Willis 2,598 (31.66%)
||
|Myrna Driedger 4,460 (54.36%)
|
|Michael Rosenberg 1,106 (13.51%)
|
|
|
|
||
|Myrna Driedger
|-
|bgcolor=whitesmoke|Kirkfield Park
||
|Sharon Blady 4,985 (49.32%)
|
|Chris Kozier 3,852 (38.12%)
|
|Doug Kayler 1,261 (12.56%)
|
|
|
|
|bgcolor=whitesmoke|
|Vacant
|-
|bgcolor=whitesmoke|St. James
||
|Bonnie Korzeniowski 4,231 (55.65%)
|
|Kristine McGhee  2,344 (30.83%)
|
|Fred Morris  656 (8.63%)
|
|Mike Johannson  339 (4.47%)
|
|
||
|Bonnie Korzeniowski
|-
|bgcolor=whitesmoke|Tuxedo
|
|Matt Schaubroeck  2,590 (30.62%)
||
|Heather Stefanson 3,982 (47.07%)
|
|Audra Bayer  1,865 (21.92%)
|
|
|
|
||
|Heather Stefanson
|-
|bgcolor=whitesmoke| Totals 
|
|NDP19,581 (45.32%)
|
|PC 17,324 (40.10%)
|
|Liberal  5,347 (12.38%)
|
|Green  954 (2.21%)
|
|
|
|
|}

Central Winnipeg

|-
|bgcolor=whitesmoke|Fort Rouge
||
|Jennifer Howard 3,828 (46.97%)
|
|Christine Waddell 1,202 (14.75%)
|
|Paul Hesse 2,488 (30.53%)
|
|Gerald Enns 511 (6.27%)
|
|Frank Komarniski (Communist) 29 (0.36%)  Ron Nash (Ind) 92 (1.13%)
||
|Tim Sale†
|-
|bgcolor=whitesmoke|Lord Roberts
||
|Diane McGifford  4,499 (57.86%)
|
|Wilf Makus  1,367 (17.58%)
|
|Larry Schenkeveld  1,219 (15.68%)
|
|Vere Scott  655 (8.42%)
|
|
||
|Diane McGifford
|-
|bgcolor=whitesmoke|Minto
||
|Andrew Swan 3,355 (62.82%)
|
|Kenny Daodu 658 (12.32%)
|
|Wayne Helgason 1,158 (21.68%)
|
|
|
|Cheryl-Anne Carr (Communist) 102 (1.91%)
||
|Andrew Swan
|-
|bgcolor=whitesmoke|River Heights
|
|Fiona Shiells  1,843 (19.77%)
|
|Ashley Burner  2,341 (25.11%)
||
|Jon Gerrard  4,760 (51.06%)
|
|Christine Bennet-Clark  378 (4.05%)
|
|
||
|Jon Gerrard
|-
|bgcolor=whitesmoke|Wolseley
||
|Rob Altemeyer 4,005 (63.88%)
|
|Gustav Nelson 712 (11.44%)
|
|Raven Thundersky 700 (11.31%)
|
|Ardythe Basham 761 (12.07%)
|
|David Tymoshchuk (Communist) 82 (1.30%)
||
|Rob Altemeyer
|-
|bgcolor=whitesmoke| Totals 
|
|NDP17,530 (47.71%)
|
|PC 6,279 (17.09%)
|
|Liberal  10,325 (28.10%)
|
|Green  2305 (6.27%)
|
|Others  305 (0.83%)
|
|
|}

South Winnipeg

|-
|bgcolor=whitesmoke|Fort Garry
||
|Kerri Irvin-Ross 4,291 (52.60%)
|
|Shaun McCaffrey 2,101 (25.75%)
|
|Craig Hildahl 1,500 (18.39%)
|
|Alon Weinberg 264 (3.26%)
|
|
||
|Kerri Irvin-Ross
|-
|bgcolor=whitesmoke|Fort Whyte
|
|Sunny Dhaliwal 3,895 (33.83%)
||
|Hugh McFadyen 5,981 (51.95%)
|
|Angelina Olivier-Job 1,637 (14.22%)
|
|
|
|
||
|Hugh McFadyen
|-
|bgcolor=whitesmoke|Riel
||
|Christine Melnick4,894 (57.19%)
|
|Trudy Turner  2,620 (30.69%)
|
|Grant Woods  1,024 (11.99%)
|
|
|
|
||
|Christine Melnick
|-
|bgcolor=whitesmoke|Seine River
||
|Theresa Oswald 5,786 (56.89%)
|
|Steven Andjelic 3,275 (32.20%)
|
|Jennifer Lukovich 1,111 (14.68%)
|
|
|
|
||
|Theresa Oswald
|-
|bgcolor=whitesmoke|Southdale
||
|Erin Selby 5,772 (51.04%)
|
|Jack Reimer 4,493 (39.74%)
|
|Don Woodstock 1,042 (9.22%)
|
|
|
|
||
|Jack Reimer
|-
|bgcolor=whitesmoke|St. Norbert
||
|Marilyn Brick  4,044 (53.74%)
|
|Tara Brousseau  2,404 (31.94%)
|
|Wendy Bloomfield  1,077 (14.31%)
|
|
|
|
||
|Marilyn Brick
|-
|bgcolor=whitesmoke|St. Vital
||
|Nancy Allan  4,611 (61.74%)
|
|Grant Cooper  1,754 (23.41%)
|
|Harry Wolbert  776 (10.36%)
|
|Kristine Koster  351 (4.68%)
|
|
||
|Nancy Allan
|-
|bgcolor=whitesmoke| Totals 
|
|NDP33,293 (53.63%)
|
|PC 20,008 (32.23%)
|
|Liberal  8,167 (13.15%)
|
|Green  615 (0.99%)
|
|
|
|
|}

By-elections since 2007

References

External links
CBC: Manitoba votes 2007
Election Almanac - Manitoba Provincial Election
Elections Manitoba
Manitoba legislature
Manitoba Government

Further reading
 

2007 elections in Canada
2007
2007 in Manitoba
May 2007 events in Canada